Gavan Darreh (also Romanized as Gavandareh; also known as Gevendere, Kavandaraq, Kūndareh, Kundarre, and Kundarreh) is a village in Howmeh Rural District in the Central District of Khodabandeh County, Zanjan Province, Iran. At the 2006 census, its population was 799, in 185 families.

References 

Populated places in Khodabandeh County